Buck Branch may refer to:

Buck Branch (Deer Creek), a stream in Missouri
Buck Branch (Duck River), a stream in Tennessee